DD Goa is a  bi-lingual Indian state owned terrestrial television station operated by public service broadcaster Doordarshan.

Formerly known as DD Panaji, it is Doordarshan's regional television station broadcasting from Panaji, the capital city of the Indian state of Goa.

The programmes are broadcast in Konkani and Marathi languages. The channel is available on Doordarshan's DTH platform DD Free Dish. DD Goa TV is now available on DD FreeDish Channel Number 97.

References

Hindi-language television channels in India
Television channels and stations established in 1990
Hindi-language television stations
Television stations in Goa
1990 establishments in Goa
Doordarshan
Konkani-language television stations
Marathi-language television channels